Sonakhali is a village within the jurisdiction of the Basanti police station in the Basanti CD block in the Canning subdivision of the South 24 Parganas district in the Indian state of West Bengal.

Geography

Area overview
Canning subdivision has a very low level of urbanization. Only 12.37% of the population lives in the urban areas and 87.63% lives in the rural areas. There are 8 census towns in Canning I CD block and only 2 in the rest of the subdivision. The entire district is situated in the Ganges Delta with numerous islands in the southern part of the region. The area (shown in the map alongside) borders on the Sundarbans National Park and a major portion of it is a part of the Sundarbans settlements. It is a flat low-lying area in the South Bidyadhari plains. The Matla River is prominent and there are many streams and water channels locally known as khals. A comparatively recent country-wide development is the guarding of the coastal areas with a special coastal force.

Note: The map alongside presents some of the notable locations in the subdivision. All places marked in the map are linked in the larger full screen map.

Location

Demographics
According to the 2011 Census of India, Sonakhali had a total population of 10,582, of which 5,243 (51%) were males and 5,159 (49%) were females. There were 1,654 persons in the age range of 0 to 6 years. The total number of literate persons in Sonakhali was 6,495 (72.75% of the population over 6 years).

Civic administration

CD block HQ
The headquarters of the Basanti CD block are located at Sonakhali.

Transport
Sonakhali is on the State Highway 3 (locally popular as Basanti Highway).

Education
Sonakhali High School is a Bengali-medium co-educational institution, established in 1968. It has facilities for teaching from class VI to class XII.

Healthcare
Basanti Rural Hospital at Basanti, with 30 beds, is the major government medical facility in the Basanti CD block.

References

External links

Villages in South 24 Parganas district